Conuber incei (common name - Ince's Moon Snail, Ince's Sand Snail) is a species of predatory sea snail,in the family Naticidae, the moon snails.  It was first described in 1853 as Natica incei by Rodolfo Philippi, from a specimen collected at Raines Island in the Torres Strait, by Captain Ince, R.N.  (thus giving the species epithet, Incei).

It is a marine snail found on mud-silt and sand flats. In Australia, it is found in South Australia, Victoria, New South Wales, and Queensland.

References

External links
Conuber incei images & occurrence data from GBIF
Conuber incei images at iNaturalist

Naticidae
Gastropods described in 1853
Taxa named by Rodolfo Amando Philippi